Metalist or Metallist may refer to:
 Metalist, Slovianoserbsk Raion, a village in Ukraine
 Metallist, Vladimir Oblast, a rural locality in Russia
 FC Metalist Kharkiv, Ukrainian football club
 FC Metalist 1925 Kharkiv, Ukrainian football club
 Metalist Oblast Sports Complex, multi-purpose sport stadium in Kharkiv, Ukraine
 Metadata, in some contexts referred to as a metalist or as a meta-list
 Metallist, Soviet manufacturer of the NSV machine gun

See also 
 Medalist